Pempelia albariella is a species of snout moth. It is found in Spain, France, Italy, Croatia, North Macedonia, Hungary, Slovakia, Romania, Ukraine, Russia (particularly in Crimea) and Kazakhstan.

References

Moths described in 1839
Phycitini
Moths of Europe
Insects of Turkey